Wilhelm Joseph Burger (15 March 1844 – 7 March 1920) was an Austrian photographer and painter, based in Vienna. Around the 1870s, he traveled to Thailand and Japan, as well as the Arctic, where he took photographs that have become historical documents and are kept in international archives.

Biography 
Burger learned photography from his uncle Andreas von Ettingshausen (1796–1878) in the 1860s. In 1874, Burger operated a photographic studio in Vienna. When working in French, Burger used the first initial "G.", obviously for "Guillaume". As part of an Austro-Hungarian expedition to Japan led by Karl von Scherzer, he took photographs in this country around 1869, and in 1872, accompanied the Wilczek expedition, a preparatory endeavour for the Payer-Weyprecht polar expedition.

A fairly recent discovery has been made of photographs of Siam (Thailand) that were originally attributed to Wilhelm Burger (published in book form by Mr. Pipat Pongrapeeporn, 2001). These photographs, that had been found in Europe in a private collection, were compared to photographs of the same era taken by the Thai court photographer Khun Sunthornsathitsalak (Christian name: Francis Chit).  When these photos were lined up side-by-side, it was discovered that what many had considered as individual photographs, taken by two different photographers, were actually part of a set meant to be combined to form a panoramic view.

The complete set of photographs, now correctly attributed to Francis Chit, was returned to Thailand and is now illuminating a new generation of Thai and Western students, historians, and everyday people as to what Bangkok of the 1860s looked like.

In a recent book on Austrian naval visits in Siam (Auf den Spuren von Österreichs Marine in Siam), published in June 2012, the author W. Donko concludes that not only these pictures, but a substantial part of the 1869 Siam photo collection attributed to Wilhelm Burger was in fact taken by the court photographer of the King of Siam, Francis Chit. Already in 2011, T. Akiyoshi and P. Pantzer showed in an article published in the magazine "Photo Researcher Nr. 15/2011“ that Burger had also bought most of his 1869 photographs of Japan from local photo studios there. The background of Burgers’ 1869 photographs taken in China has not yet been analyzed in this regard.

See also 

 History of photography 1850-1900
 Baron Raimund von Stillfried

References

1844 births
1920 deaths
Austrian photographers
Photography in Japan
Photography in Thailand
Year of birth uncertain